The mayor of Whakatāne is the head of the municipal government in Whakatāne District, New Zealand. The mayor presides over the Whakatane District Council, which was first formed in 1976 following an amalgamation, with further changes taking place in 1989.

The current mayor of Whakatāne is Victor Luca, who was elected in 2022.

Role 
The mayor of Whakatāne leads the Whakatāne District Council which includes the deputy mayor and nine councillors. The mayor is a member of all of the council's committees excluding the Hearings Committee and is deputy chairperson of the Policy Committee and chairperson of the Audit and Risk Committee. Additionally, the mayor is a member of joint committees and groups including the Bay of Plenty Civil Defence Emergency Management Group, the Regional Transport Committee, the Commercial Advisory Board, and the Eastern Bay of Plenty Joint Committee (which is composed of members of the Whakatane, Kawerau, and Opotiki District Councils and the Bay of Plenty Regional Council).

Elections for the mayor take place every three years as part of the local elections in New Zealand, with the last election being held in 2019. The mayor received a salary of $121,899 plus expenses as of 2020, and holds the title of His/Her Worship.

Lists of mayors
The following are the mayors of Whakatāne since 1917. Prior to this, the town of Whakatāne was part of Whakatane County. In 1914 the Whakatane Town Board was formed, and it ceded from Whakatane County the following year. The town board was headed by a chairman. Whakatane Borough Council was formed in 1917, headed by a mayor. Whakatane Borough and Whakatane County merged with the Whakatane Harbour Board in 1976 forming the Whakatane District Council. In 1989 the Whakatane District Council amalgamated with Murupara Borough Council and also added a portion of the Opotiki District and a portion of the Taupo District, forming the Whakatane District Council as it is today.

Bill Sullivan was chairman of the Whakatane Harbour Board (1923–1926) and mayor of the Whakatane Borough Council (1925–1938) before representing the  electorate in the House of Representatives (–1957).

Whakatane Borough Council

Whakatāne District Council

References 

Whakatane, New Zealand